The Canton of Caudebec-en-Caux is a former canton situated in the Seine-Maritime département and in the Haute-Normandie region of northern France. It was disbanded following the French canton reorganisation which came into effect in March 2015. It consisted of 16 communes, which joined the canton of Notre-Dame-de-Gravenchon in 2015. It had a total of 14,128 inhabitants (2012).

Geography 
An area of farming, forestry and light industry in the arrondissement of Rouen, centred on the small town of Caudebec-en-Caux. The altitude varies from 0m (Heurteauville) to 154m (Saint-Aubin-de-Crétot) with an average altitude of 43m.

The canton comprised 16 communes:

Anquetierville
Caudebec-en-Caux
Heurteauville
Louvetot
La Mailleraye-sur-Seine
Maulévrier-Sainte-Gertrude
Notre-Dame-de-Bliquetuit
Saint-Arnoult
Saint-Aubin-de-Crétot
Saint-Gilles-de-Crétot
Saint-Nicolas-de-Bliquetuit
Saint-Nicolas-de-la-Haie
Saint-Wandrille-Rançon
Touffreville-la-Cable
Vatteville-la-Rue
Villequier

Population

See also 
 Arrondissements of the Seine-Maritime department
 Cantons of the Seine-Maritime department
 Communes of the Seine-Maritime department

References

Caudebec-en-Caux
2015 disestablishments in France
States and territories disestablished in 2015